Luxor Governorate has been one of Egypt's governorates since 7 December 2009, when former president Hosni Mubarak announced its separation from the Qena Governorate. It is located 635 km south of Cairo. It lies in Upper Egypt along the Nile. The city of Luxor is the capital of the Luxor governorate.

Overview
Despite the governorate being one of the top destinations for tourists in Egypt, the poverty rate is more than 60% in this governorate but recently some social safety networks have been provided in the form of financial assistance and job opportunities. The funding has been coordinated by the country's Ministry of Finance and with assistance from international organizations.

Municipal divisions
The governorate is divided into the following municipal divisions with a total estimated population as of July 2017 of 1,255,703. In some instances there is a markaz and a kism with the same name.

Emblem
The emblem of Luxor represents the bust of Tutankhamun on board of an Ancient Egyptian canoe boat, cruising in the Nile, with an obelisk and the sun light in the background.

Geography
The governorate's total area is 2960 km2, representing 0.24% of the country's area.

Population
At the 2012 census, the population of the area which in 2009 was formed into the new Luxor Governorate was 1,064,000 people. 47.4% of them lived in urban areas, while 52.6% lived in rural areas. The annual population growth rate is 18.2 per thousand. Population estimates from 2015 puts the same figure at 1,147,058 with an urbanization rate of 37.8%.

Industrial zones
According to the Egyptian Governing Authority for Investment and Free Zones (GAFI), in affiliation with the Ministry of Investment (MOI), the following industrial zones are located in this governorate:
El Boghdadi 
(New urban community industrial zone) New Tiba

References

External links 
 City of Luxor Official website

 
Governorates of Egypt
2009 establishments in Egypt